Stupid Man Smart Phone is a 2018 adventure reality streaming television series produced by Voot and hosted by Sumeet Vyas. It premiered Voot on 20 September 2017. It is an official Indian adaptation of a BBC Worldwide show by the same name.

Cast

Main cast 

 Sumeet Vyas
 Evelyn Sharma
 Karan Kundrra
 Sahil Khattar

Reception

Critical reviews 
Letty Mariam Abraham of Mid-Day gave 2.5 stars and wrote "Watch the show for Vyas and his quirky remarks; the rest offers nothing new."

Rajat Tripathi of Bollywood Life wrote "Beautiful locations, crisp editing, adventurous tasks make for a near perfect reality show only failed by the poor execution of the concept. Do check out the show if your are a Sumeet Vyas fan...you haven't seen this raw and real side of the talented actor."

Almas Khateeb of The Quint praises the editing, saying "Another thing that deserves a mention is the camera work on the show. The shots that pan into the wilderness are amazing and provide an immersive experience to those of us watching it."

References

External links 

 

Adventure reality television series
Indian adventure television series
2018 web series debuts